The second season of Crazy Ex-Girlfriend premiered on The CW on October 21, 2016 and ran for 13 episodes until February 3, 2017. The season stars Rachel Bloom as Rebecca Bunch, a young lawyer who finds herself pursuing a relationship with the object of her obsession, Josh Chan, as she continues her quest to find true happiness. Vincent Rodriguez III, Santino Fontana, Donna Lynne Champlin, Pete Gardner, Vella Lovell, and Gabrielle Ruiz co-star.

Cast

Main
 Rachel Bloom as Rebecca Bunch
 Vincent Rodriguez III as Josh Chan
 Santino Fontana as Greg Serrano
 Donna Lynne Champlin as Paula Proctor
 Pete Gardner as Darryl Whitefeather
 Vella Lovell as Heather Davis
 Gabrielle Ruiz as Maria "Valencia" Perez

Recurring

 Eugene Cordero as Alex
 Gina Gallego as Mrs. Hernandez
 Jacob Guenther as Chris
 Amy Hill as Lourdes Chan
 David Hull as White Josh
 Erick Lopez as Hector
 Johnny Ray Meeks as Kevin
 Steve Monroe as Scott Proctor
 Elijah Nelson as Brendan Proctor
 Robin Thomas as Marco Serrano
 Rene Gube as Father Brah
 Michael McMillian as Tim
 Burl Moseley as Jim
 Michael Hyatt as Dr. Noelle Akopian
 Esther Povitsky as Maya
 Stephnie Weir as Karen
 Parvesh Cheena as Sunil Odhav
 Brittany Snow as Anna Hicks
 Danny Jolles as George
 Scott Michael Foster as Nathaniel Plimpton III
 Tovah Feldshuh as Naomi Bunch

Guest

 Yael Grobglas as Trina
 Paul Welsh as Trent Maddock
 Steele Stebbins as Tommy Proctor
 Patti LuPone as Rabbi Shari
 Rachel Grate as Audra Levine
 David Grant Wright as Nathaniel Plimpton II
 Seth Green as Patrick
 John Allen Nelson as Silas Bunch
 Alberto Issac as Joseph Chan
 Tess Paras and Coryn Mabalot as Jayma and Jastenity Chan
 Eric Michael Roy as the Santa Ana Winds (impersonating Frankie Valli)
 Patton Oswalt as J. Castleman

Episodes

Every song listed is performed by Rebecca, except where indicated.

Production
The series was renewed for a second season on March 11, 2017. On May 23, 2016, it was announced that Gabrielle Ruiz, who portrays Valencia, was promoted to series regular for season two. In November, 2016, it was announced that Santino Fontana would be departing the series, with episode four of the second season resulting as his last as a series regular.

Music
"Crazy Ex-Girlfriend: Original Television Soundtrack (Season 2)" was released on March 3, 2017. It includes all the songs of season two, alongside Bloom's a cappella rough demos of "Santa Ana Winds" and "Rebecca's Reprise" alongside Adam Schlesinger and Stephen M. Gold's demo version of "I'm Just a Girl in Love", and Jack Dolgen's rough demos of "Sex Toys" and "It's Not Difficult to Define Miss Douche", two songs that didn't make it onto the final cut on the show.

Home media
The Warner Archive Collection released Season 2 as a manufacture-on-demand DVD exclusively to online retailers.

Reception

Critical response
The second season of Crazy Ex-Girlfriend received critical acclaim from critics. On Rotten Tomatoes, it has a fresh rating of 100% based on 22 reviews, with a weighted average of 9.40/10. The site's critical consensus reads, "Crazy Ex-Girlfriend"  remains delightfully weird, engaging, and even more courageous and confident in its sophomore outing." On Metacritic, the season has a score of 86 out of 100 based on 8 critics, indicating "universal acclaim".

Ratings

References

External links 

Season
2016 American television seasons
2017 American television seasons